Disenå is a village in Sør-Odal Municipality in Innlandet county, Norway. The Kongsvingerbanen railway line passes through the village. The Disenå Station on the railway was closed in 2012.

Every August the Audunbakkenfestivalen is held.

References

Sør-Odal
Villages in Innlandet
Populated places on the Glomma River